Soggadu may refer to:

 Soggadu (1975 film), a 1975 Indian Telugu-language film directed by K. Bapayya
 Soggadu (2005 film), a 2005 Indian Telugu-language film directed by Ravi Babu

See also
 Soggade Chinni Nayana, a 2016 Indian Telugu-language film directed by Kalyan Krishna Kurasala